Grong Grong is the eponymously-titled debut studio album of Grong Grong, released in 1986 by Aberrant Records.

Reception

Allmusic awarded Grong Grong two out of five possible stars. Spin compared the band favorably to The Birthday Party, saying "Grong's sound screeches and shimmers smoothly in vibrato-drowned squiggles" and that the songs "only hint at the dark, heavy, and twisted minds behind this flat black slab." Deborah Sprague of Trouser Press was especially complimentary towards guitarist Charles Tolnay, saying "where his fine abstract-expressionist guitar mist was subordinate to a series of overly pious Birthday Party eulogies like "Poor Herb" and "Louise the Fly."

Track listing

Personnel
Adapted from the Grong Grong liner notes.

Grong Grong
 Michael Farkas – lead vocals, saxophone, synthesizer, mixing
 George Klestines – drums, mixing
 Dave Taskas – bass guitar, mixing
 Charles Tolnay – guitar, mixing

Production and design
 Andrew DeCaux – cover art, illustrations
 Regina Hayson – photography
 Patrick O'Pillage (O'Pillage) – design

Release history

References

External links 
 Grong Grong at iTunes
 

1986 debut albums
Grong Grong (band) albums
Alternative Tentacles albums